LSD - Love, Scandal & Doctors is an Indian Hindi-language medical thriller web series that is streaming digitally on ALTBalaji and ZEE5 from 5 February 2021. The writers of the series are Palki Malhotra, Prakriti Mukherjee and Sumrit Shahi while it has been directed by Sattwik Mohanty, Preya Hirji, and Saqib Pandor. Produced by Ekta Kapoor under the production company Balaji Telefilms. Web series stars Rahul Dev, Punit Pathak, Ishaan A Khanna, Siddharth Mennon, Ayush Shrivastava and Neha Hinge in lead roles. It is the story of the medical profession with power, nepotism, sexual politics and the competition.

Synopsis 
It is a story of 5 interns at the leading teaching hospital KMRC who are going to find the ugly truth the hard way. They have to traverse their internship under a strict murder investigation.

Cast 
 Rahul Dev as Dr. Rana
 Punit J Pathak as Inspector Tavish Singh
 Ishaan A Khanna as Dr Kartik Rana
 Siddharth Mennon as Dr Vikramjeet Bedi
 Tanaya Sachdeva as Dr Sara Borade
 Srishti Rindhani as Dr Rahima Mansurie
 Ayush Shrivastava as Dr Kabir
 Neha Hinge as Dr Chitra Rana
 Ashmita Jaggi as Dr Samkeesha
 Pulkit Makol as Asif Mansurie
 Manish Pant as Assistant Inspector Dinesh Kohli
 Surabhi Tiwari as Mona
 Riva Arora as Rhea
Ravi Chhabra

Release date 
ALTBalaji and ZEE5 have released this web series on 5 February 2021.

Episodes

Reception

Critical reviews 
Joginder Tuteja on Rediff.com has given 4/5 stars ratings applauding that it will keep engrossed right through, with the needle of suspicion move to every character in the story. All the actors have played their role well. The writing and dialogues of the web series are good and there were no unwanted scenes. Further criticized that "When the core story works, everything else is secondary, and this holds true in the case of LSD"

Ronak Kotecha of The Times of India Review team has given 3/5 stars rating stating that it is a worth watching with a healthy dose of entertainment and fascination. With young doctors in action it is a high on adrenaline. The series has no dull moment and actors have given justice to their roles. Some of them couldn't make it through, however, all the women actors were in characters compare it to men. Loud background score, unwanted abuses and the constant back and forth in the timeline could have been avoided.

Apoorv Shandilya from Xappie has given 3/5 stars rating saying that doctors can skip this show as it is fiction based story, while others can watch it for one time at least. Criticized that Rahul Dev performance steal the show and story made more appealing. On the negative front, he stated that "The relationship between young interns and senior doctors within the hospital is made increasingly hostile just to please the show’s story". During the pandemic situation this isn’t the good time to release a show that portrays doctors in the light of evil murderers.

Pakaao has given 3.5/stars rating for this web series stating it is good show with plot and execution. Script pace was high from the beginning till the end and dialogues were very good. Acting by Siddharth Menon, Tanaya Sachdeva and Rahul Dev were good. Music, Cinematography, Special Effects, Editing team and directors has done a good job.

References

External links 
 [https://www.zee5.com/zee5originals/details/lsd-love-scandal-and-doctors/0-6-3175/episodes LSD - Love, Scandal and Doctors] at'' ZEE5
 
LSD - Love, Scandal and Doctors on ALTBalaji

Indian drama web series